Sundari Gardens is a 2022 Indian Malayalam-language romantic drama film written and directed by Charlie Davis and produced by Salim Ahamed under his banner Allens Media. The film features Aparna Balamurali and Neeraj Madhav in the lead roles. The film's music is composed by Alphons joseph with cinematography handled by Swaroop Philip and editing done by Sajit Unnikrishnan. The film directly premiere on SonyLIV on 2 September 2022.

Cast 

 Aparna Balamurali as Sundari Sara Mathews a.k.a. Suma
 Neeraj Madhav as Victor Paul
 Jude Anthany Joseph as Karnan Raghav
 Lakshmi Menon as Lekha Kurian
 Binu Pappu as Dr. Mahi
 Vijayaraghavan as Paul
 Sminu Sijo as Annammachi
 Kannan Sagar as Rarichan
 Babu jose as Salaam
 Adhish praveen as Kanthan
 Gowri as Jasmine
 Sruthy suresh as Aleena
 Shiva Hariharan as Unni
 Sanju Sanichen as Sanju
 Anagha Maria Varghese as Elizabeth
 P. Sivadas as A.K Avaran
 Laali PM as Saramma
 M. Sajish as Joy
 RJ Renu as Ancy
 Arun Cherukavil as Ajith
 Rajeev as Devadathan
 Siyadh shajahan as Renji
 Jaiden Johnson as Akhshay

Production 
The film was shot in Pala, Erattupetta, Wagamon, Kanjirappally and Manimala.

Music 
The film's soundtrack was composed by Alphons Joseph. while lyrics are written by Joe Paul. The audio rights were bought by Sony Music.

Release 
The film directly premiere on SonyLIV on 2 September 2022.

References

External links 
 

Indian romantic drama films
2020s Malayalam-language films
2022 films